The Heavy are an English rock band from Bath, Somerset, England, formed in 2007. They have released five albums as well as a wide array of singles. Their music has been widely used in the media, with their 2009 single "How You Like Me Now?" becoming their biggest hit.

History
Formed in 2007 the band includes four members: Kelvin Swaby (lead vocals), Dan Taylor (guitar), Spencer Page (bass guitar) and Chris Ellul (drums). Swaby and Taylor became friends in 1998 when they bonded over vintage R&B music and Jim Jarmusch films and soon formed the band.

The Heavy released two singles in the last half of 2007. Their first single was "That Kind of Man", which was released by Don't Touch Recordings and was mixed by Corin Dingley. Dingley was the original drummer and co-producer of the first album before being discovered by Ninja Tune, who promptly signed Swaby, Taylor, and Dingley. The Heavy released their first album Great Vengeance and Furious Fire on 17 September 2007 in the United Kingdom, and on 8 April 2008 in the United States.

On 26 March 2008, the Heavy were named ’artist of the day’ in Spin. The band was also mentioned in the Rolling Stone Hot List May 2008. They played at the 2008 South By Southwest (SXSW) music festival on the 89.3 Current Stage and collected one of the Best Discovery awards in Spin Magazine'''s "Best and Worst of SXSW 2008".SXSW '08: SPIN's Best and Worst at Spin Magazine Online

The Heavy appeared on the 2009 album Johnny Cash Remixed with a version of "Doing My Time". On 2 October 2009 their second album The House That Dirt Built was released by Counter Records. The band's third album The Glorious Dead was released on 21 August 2012 via a partnership between Counter Records and Ninja Tune. The band undertook an extensive tour of the United States from August to September 2012 with sponsorship from the American beer company Miller Lite. The band also had a string of European dates to support The Glorious Dead, from October to November 2012. On 1 April 2016, The Heavy released their fourth album, Hurt & the Merciless.

The Heavy toured Europe and the United States in 2016, making stops at major festivals including Coachella Valley Music and Arts Festival, South by Southwest, Free Press Summer Fest, INmusic festival, Fuji Rock Festival, Hurricane Festival, and Southside Festival.

Musical style
The Heavy play a mix of guitar-heavy neo soul and rock using crunchy guitar, funky horns, and raspy James Brown-like vocals. "Oh No! Not You Again" emulates garage rock, and "Girl" is a combination of spoken word and rap sampled from Terry Reid's "Superlungs".

In media
"How You Like Me Now?" is featured in several television series episodes: the twentieth episode of the fourth season of The Vampire Diaries, the sixth season finale of Entourage, the fourth episode of Community, the third episode of Rookie Blue, and the second season summer finale of White Collar. The song is featured throughout the 2010 feature film The Fighter.The song is features in The Expendables 3. It is featured on the soundtrack of the baseball video game MLB 10: The Show. It was featured in the 2011 film Horrible Bosses and its 2014 sequel, as well as the trailer for The Change-Up. It was featured in the alternative ending for the film Limitless. The song is played on the soundtrack of the film This Means War. The song was used in a Kia Sorento television commercial, which was broadcast during Super Bowl XLIV, and returned for Super Bowl LIII, this time in a Jeep Gladiator commercial as well as an advert for Argos. The song appears in the soundtrack for Driver: San Francisco along with songs "Big Bad Wolf" and "The Sleeping Ignoramus". The song was used in pro skateboarder Torey Pudwill's Big Bang video in the summer of 2011. The song was also used in a commercial for Strongbow cider in the UK. It was recently featured on the Ted movie trailer. The song was also the theme song to MLB Network's television show, Intentional Talk and for MSNBC's afternoon broadcast of Martin Bashir's news commentary. It was also featured in the credits for the movie G.I. Joe: Retaliation and on trailers and TV spots for Turbo.

"How You Like Me Now?" could be heard being played over the speakers at the McCormick Place Convention Center in Chicago, Illinois, the 2012 election night location for U.S. President Barack Obama, just after the projected results for Ohio were announced. The Electoral College votes from Ohio clinched the 2012 Presidential re-election for him. The band played the song on the Late Show with David Letterman on 18 January 2010. This was the first time that Letterman had ever asked a musical artist to perform an encore on his show.The Heavy perform "How You Like Me Now?" on The Late Show with David Letterman (includes encore performance) On 9 June 2010 "How You Like Me Now?" was featured in the opening montage of Hockey Night in Canada's broadcast of Game 6 of the Stanley Cup Finals. "How You Like Me Now?" also featured in the 2014 video game, Forza Horizon 2. "That Kind of Man" from the band's first album was featured in "Filthy Lucre", an episode of the series Californication.

"That Kind Of Man" was used in the trailer for Parker and "Coleen" also in FIFA 09 both from the band's first album, was featured in "Play the Man", an episode of the USA network television show Suits. The show also used "What Makes a Good Man?" for the season 2 promo, "Can't Play Dead" in episode "Zane vs. Zane" and "Short Change Hero" in episode "War".

"Short Change Hero", from the Heavy's second album, has been used in the film Faster; The TV shows "The Outlaws (2021 TV series)", The Vampire Diaries, The Listener, Suits, The Umbrella Academy, and Killjoys; the ITV documentary Best of Enemies; the trailer for Batman: Arkham City, and in the promos for the first season of Haven and second season of Longmire. The song was also used as the theme song since the second season of Strike Back. The video game Borderlands 2 featured "Short Change Hero" in the opening scene and "How You Like Me Now?" in the end credits. An instrumental jazz version of "Short Change Hero" later appeared in Poker Night 2, which featured characters from Borderlands. "What Makes A Good Man?" was later used in the credits of the next game released, Borderlands: The Pre-Sequel. The band recorded the song "Put It On The Line" for the theme of Borderlands 3. The song also features in the virtual reality rhythm shooter game Pistol Whip during the opening level of the campaign "Smoke and Thunder".

"What Makes A Good Man?", from their third album, was used for the launch trailer of Sleeping Dogs, the official theme song for the 2013 Royal Rumble pay-per-view event, was featured in the 2013 film Grudge Match, the video game NHL 13, the trailer for Dallas Buyers Club and Guinness' "Sapeurs" commercial, a production in collaboration with the advertisement agency, AMV BBDO, which was hailed as one of the most successful example of brand-agency partnership as top-classed quality adverts have been consistently produced. In addition, the song also appeared in the H&M commercials featuring David Beckham. The band also made their second appearance on Late Show with David Letterman on 28 August 2012 performing "What Makes A Good Man?" gaining their second encore on the show. The song was also featured in an episode of The Grand Tour titled "Lochdown".

The band was asked to record a cover of the song "And When I Die" for the fourth season finale of True Blood. It also appeared on the third True Blood soundtrack.

"Who Needs The Sunshine?" was featured in the penultimate episode of the fourth series of Being Human, "Making History". The song was featured in a promo for the Cinemax series Hunted.

"Big Bad Wolf" was used in the 2010 film The Losers (based on the comic series of the same name) and was also used in the episode "Brotherfae of the Wolves" of the Canadian TV show Lost Girl and in the credits sequence to Season 2 Episode 1 of the British crime-drama Luther. It was also used in the BBC Two series Top Gear in episode 4 of series 21. The CBS show Battle Creek used the song throughout its third episode. The song is often used in Blue Angels performances.

The song "Same 'Ol'" was used for the launch trailer for the game Splinter Cell: Blacklist, while a variation of it was used in the trailer for Quentin Tarantino's eighth feature film, The Hateful Eight. The song was also used in a montage during the first episode of The Grand Tour. It was the soundtrack for the Pepsi Momotaro CM series featuring Shun Oguri

The song "Don't Say Nothing" was used in the trailer for Kingsman: The Secret Service, included in Gameloft's Gangstar Vegas, and appeared on the soundtrack for FIFA 13.

On 23 February 2016, The Heavy were the musical guest on Le Petit Journal (Canal+) where they performed their single, "Turn Up" from their album Hurt & The Merciless. In addition, the song is featured on the video game soundtrack of EA Sports Madden NFL 17.

The song "Better As One" was used in the 2019 film Fast & Furious Presents: Hobbs & Shaw.

DiscographyGreat Vengeance and Furious Fire (2007)The House That Dirt Built (2009)The Glorious Dead (2012)Hurt & the Merciless  (2016)Sons (2019)Amen'' (2023)

References

External links 
 

English indie rock groups
British soul musical groups
English funk musical groups
Ninja Tune artists
Musical quartets
Musical groups established in 2007
Counter Records artists